Podnah's Pit Barbecue is a barbecue restaurant in Portland, Oregon.

Rodney Muirhead opened the restaurant in 2006.

See also

 List of barbecue restaurants
 List of Diners, Drive-Ins and Dives episodes

References

External links
 
 Podnah's Pit at the Food Network
 Podnah's Pit Barbecue at Portland Monthly
 Podnah's Pit BBQ at Zomato

2006 establishments in Oregon
Barbecue restaurants in Oregon
Restaurants established in 2006
Restaurants in Portland, Oregon